ESGN may refer to:

ESGN navigation system USS Baton Rouge (SSN-689) 
Electrostatically Supported Gyro Navigator Ohio-class submarine
Esgn, Ensign (rank)
ESGN List of airports in Sweden Brännebrona Airport
 ESports Global Network (ESGN). Dan Stemkoski etc.
 ESGN (album), the debut studio album by American rapper Freddie Gibbs.